In statistics, a normal distribution or Gaussian distribution is a type of continuous probability distribution for a real-valued random variable. The general form of its probability density function is

The parameter  is the mean or expectation of the distribution (and also its median and mode), while the parameter  is its standard deviation. A random variable with a Gaussian distribution is said to be normally distributed, and is called a normal deviate.

Normal distributions are important in statistics and are often used in the natural and social sciences to represent real-valued random variables whose distributions are not known. Their importance is partly due to the central limit theorem. It states that, under some conditions, the average of many samples (observations) of a random variable with finite mean and variance is itself a random variable—whose distribution converges to a normal distribution as the number of samples increases. Therefore, physical quantities that are expected to be the sum of many independent processes, such as measurement errors, often have distributions that are nearly normal.

Moreover, Gaussian distributions have some unique properties that are valuable in analytic studies. For instance, any linear combination of a fixed collection of normal deviates is a normal deviate. Many results and methods, such as propagation of uncertainty and least squares parameter fitting, can be derived analytically in explicit form when the relevant variables are normally distributed.

A normal distribution is sometimes informally called a bell curve. However, many other distributions are bell-shaped (such as the Cauchy, Student's t, and logistic distributions).  For other names, see Naming.

The univariate probability distribution is generalized for vectors in the multivariate normal distribution and for matrices in the matrix normal distribution.

Definitions

Standard normal distribution 
The simplest case of a normal distribution is known as the standard normal distribution or unit normal distribution.

The variable  has a mean of 0 and a variance and standard deviation of 1.

Although the density above is most commonly known as the standard normal, a few authors have used that term to describe other versions of the normal distribution. Carl Friedrich Gauss, for example, once defined the standard normal as

which has a variance of 1/2, and Stephen Stigler once defined the standard normal as 

which has a simple functional form and a variance of

General normal distribution 

The probability density must be scaled by  so that the integral is still 1.

If  is a standard normal deviate, then  will have a normal distribution with expected value  and standard deviation .

Notation 
The probability density of the standard Gaussian distribution (standard normal distribution, with zero mean and unit variance) is often denoted with the Greek letter  (phi). The alternative form of the Greek letter phi, is also used quite often.

Thus when a random variable  is normally distributed with mean  and standard deviation , one may write

Alternative parameterizations 
Some authors advocate using the precision  as the parameter defining the width of the distribution, instead of the deviation  or the variance . The precision is normally defined as the reciprocal of the variance, . The formula for the distribution then becomes

This choice is claimed to have advantages in numerical computations when  is very close to zero, and simplifies formulas in some contexts, such as in the Bayesian inference of variables with multivariate normal distribution.

Alternatively, the reciprocal of the standard deviation  might be defined as the precision, in which case the expression of the normal distribution becomes

 

According to Stigler, this formulation is advantageous because of a much simpler and easier-to-remember formula, and simple approximate formulas for the quantiles of the distribution.

Cumulative distribution functions 
The cumulative distribution function (CDF) of the standard normal distribution, usually denoted with the capital Greek letter  (phi), is the integral

The related error function  gives the probability of a random variable, with normal distribution of mean 0 and variance 1/2 falling in the range . That is:

These integrals cannot be expressed in terms of elementary functions, and are often said to be special functions. However, many numerical approximations are known; see below for more.

The two functions are closely related, namely

 

For a generic normal distribution with density , mean  and deviation , the cumulative distribution function is

The complement of the standard normal CDF, is often called the Q-function, especially in engineering texts. It gives the probability that the value of a standard normal random variable  will exceed : .

The graph of the standard normal CDF  has 2-fold rotational symmetry around the point (0,1/2); that is, . Its antiderivative (indefinite integral) can be expressed as follows: 

The CDF of the standard normal distribution can be expanded by Integration by parts into a series:

where  denotes the double factorial.

An asymptotic expansion of the CDF for large x can also be derived using integration by parts. For more, see Error function#Asymptotic expansion.

A quick approximation to the standard normal distribution's CDF can be found by using a Taylor series approximation:

Standard deviation and coverage 

About 68% of values drawn from a normal distribution are within one standard deviation σ away from the mean; about 95% of the values lie within two standard deviations; and about 99.7% are within three standard deviations. This fact is known as the 68-95-99.7 (empirical) rule, or the 3-sigma rule.

For large , one can use the approximation .

Quantile function 

The quantile function of a distribution is the inverse of the cumulative distribution function. The quantile function of the standard normal distribution is called the probit function, and can be expressed in terms of the inverse error function:

For a normal random variable with mean  and variance , the quantile function is

These values are used in hypothesis testing, construction of confidence intervals and Q–Q plots. A normal random variable  will exceed  with probability , and will lie outside the interval  with probability . In particular, the quantile  is 1.96; therefore a normal random variable will lie outside the interval  in only 5% of cases.

The following table gives the quantile  such that  will lie in the range  with a specified probability . These values are useful to determine tolerance interval for sample averages and other statistical estimators with normal (or asymptotically normal) distributions. Note that the following table shows , not  as defined above.

For small , the quantile function has the useful asymptotic expansion

Properties 
The normal distribution is the only distribution whose cumulants beyond the first two (i.e., other than the mean and variance) are zero. It is also the continuous distribution with the maximum entropy for a specified mean and variance. Geary has shown, assuming that the mean and variance are finite, that the normal distribution is the only distribution where the mean and variance calculated from a set of independent draws are independent of each other.

The normal distribution is a subclass of the elliptical distributions. The normal distribution is symmetric about its mean, and is non-zero over the entire real line. As such it may not be a suitable model for variables that are inherently positive or strongly skewed, such as the weight of a person or the price of a share. Such variables may be better described by other distributions, such as the log-normal distribution or the Pareto distribution.

The value of the normal distribution is practically zero when the value  lies more than a few standard deviations away from the mean (e.g., a spread of three standard deviations covers all but 0.27% of the total distribution). Therefore, it may not be an appropriate model when one expects a significant fraction of outliers—values that lie many standard deviations away from the mean—and least squares and other statistical inference methods that are optimal for normally distributed variables often become highly unreliable when applied to such data. In those cases, a more heavy-tailed distribution should be assumed and the appropriate robust statistical inference methods applied.

The Gaussian distribution belongs to the family of stable distributions which are the attractors of sums of independent, identically distributed distributions whether or not the mean or variance is finite. Except for the Gaussian which is a limiting case, all stable distributions have heavy tails and infinite variance. It is one of the few distributions that are stable and that have probability density functions that can be expressed analytically, the others being the Cauchy distribution and the Lévy distribution.

Symmetries and derivatives 
The normal distribution with density  (mean  and standard deviation ) has the following properties:
 It is symmetric around the point  which is at the same time the mode, the median and the mean of the distribution.
 The area bounded by the curve and the -axis is unity (i.e. equal to one).
 Its first derivative is 
 Its density is log-concave.
 Its density is infinitely differentiable, indeed supersmooth of order 2.

Furthermore, the density  of the standard normal distribution (i.e.  and ) also has the following properties:
 Its first derivative is 
 Its second derivative is 
 More generally, its th derivative is  where  is the th (probabilist) Hermite polynomial.

Moments 

Usually we are interested only in moments with integer order .

If  has a normal distribution, the non-central moments exist and are finite for any  whose real part is greater than −1. For any non-negative integer , the plain central moments are:

The central absolute moments coincide with plain moments for all even orders, but are nonzero for odd orders. For any non-negative integer 

The last formula is valid also for any non-integer  When the mean  the plain and absolute moments can be expressed in terms of confluent hypergeometric functions  and 

These expressions remain valid even if  is not an integer. See also generalized Hermite polynomials.

The expectation of  conditioned on the event that  lies in an interval  is given by

For  this is known as the inverse Mills ratio.

Fourier transform and characteristic function 
The Fourier transform of a normal density  with mean  and standard deviation  is

where  is the imaginary unit. If the mean , the first factor is 1, and the Fourier transform is, apart from a constant factor, a normal density on the frequency domain, with mean 0 and standard deviation . In particular, the standard normal distribution  is an eigenfunction of the Fourier transform.

This definition can be analytically extended to a complex-value variable . The relation between both is:

Moment and cumulant generating functions 
For a normal distribution with density , mean  and deviation , the moment generating function exists and is equal to

The cumulant generating function is the logarithm of the moment generating function, namely

Stein operator and class 

Zero-variance limit 
In the limit when  tends to zero, the probability density  eventually tends to zero at any , but grows without limit if , while its integral remains equal to 1. Therefore, the normal distribution cannot be defined as an ordinary function when .

However, one can define the normal distribution with zero variance as a generalized function; specifically, as Dirac's "delta function"  translated by the mean , that is 
Its CDF is then the Heaviside step function translated by the mean , namely

Maximum entropy 
Of all probability distributions over the reals with a specified mean  and variance , the normal distribution  is the one with maximum entropy.

where  is understood to be zero whenever . This functional can be maximized, subject to the constraints that the distribution is properly normalized and has a specified variance, by using variational calculus. A function with two Lagrange multipliers is defined:

where  is, for now, regarded as some density function with mean  and standard deviation .

Since this must hold for any small , the term in brackets must be zero, and solving for  yields:

The entropy of a normal distribution is equal to

Other properties

Related distributions

Central limit theorem 

The central limit theorem states that under certain (fairly common) conditions, the sum of many random variables will have an approximately normal distribution.
mean scaled by 

Then, as  increases, the probability distribution of  will tend to the normal distribution with zero mean and variance .

The theorem can be extended to variables  that are not independent and/or not identically distributed if certain constraints are placed on the degree of dependence and the moments of the distributions.

Many test statistics, scores, and estimators encountered in practice contain sums of certain random variables in them, and even more estimators can be represented as sums of random variables through the use of influence functions. The central limit theorem implies that those statistical parameters will have asymptotically normal distributions.

The central limit theorem also implies that certain distributions can be approximated by the normal distribution, for example:
 The binomial distribution  is approximately normal with mean  and variance  for large  and for  not too close to 0 or 1.
 The chi-squared distribution  is approximately normal with mean  and variance , for large .
 The Student's t-distribution  is approximately normal with mean 0 and variance 1 when  is large.

Whether these approximations are sufficiently accurate depends on the purpose for which they are needed, and the rate of convergence to the normal distribution. It is typically the case that such approximations are less accurate in the tails of the distribution.

A general upper bound for the approximation error in the central limit theorem is given by the Berry–Esseen theorem, improvements of the approximation are given by the Edgeworth expansions.

This theorem can also be used to justify modeling the sum of many uniform noise sources as Gaussian noise. See AWGN.

Operations and functions of normal variables 

The probability density, cumulative distribution, and inverse cumulative distribution of any function of one or more independent or correlated normal variables can be computed with the numerical method of ray-tracing (Matlab code). In the following sections we look at some special cases.

Operations on a single normal variable 
If  is distributed normally with mean  and variance , then
That is, the family of normal distributions is closed under linear transformations.
 The absolute value of  has folded normal distribution: . If  this is known as the half-normal distribution.
 The absolute value of normalized residuals, |X − μ|/σ, has chi distribution with one degree of freedom: .
 The square of X/σ has the noncentral chi-squared distribution with one degree of freedom: . If , the distribution is called simply chi-squared.
 The log-likelihood of a normal variable  is simply the log of its probability density function:  Since this is a scaled and shifted square of a standard normal variable, it is distributed as a scaled and shifted chi-squared variable.
 The distribution of the variable X restricted to an interval [a, b] is called the truncated normal distribution.
 (X − μ)−2 has a Lévy distribution with location 0 and scale σ−2.

Operations on two independent normal variables 
This is a special case of the polarization identity.
It follows that the normal distribution is stable (with exponent ).

Operations on two independent standard normal variables 
 Their sum and difference is distributed normally with mean zero and variance two: .
 Their product  follows the product distribution with density function  where  is the modified Bessel function of the second kind.
 Their ratio follows the standard Cauchy distribution: .
 Their Euclidean norm  has the Rayleigh distribution.

Operations on multiple independent normal variables 
 Any linear combination of independent normal deviates is a normal deviate.
 If  are independent standard normal random variables, then the sum of their squares has the chi-squared distribution with  degrees of freedom 
 If  are independent normally distributed random variables with means  and variances , then their sample mean is independent from the sample standard deviation, which can be demonstrated using Basu's theorem or Cochran's theorem. The ratio of these two quantities will have the Student's t-distribution with  degrees of freedom: 

Operations on multiple correlated normal variables 
 A quadratic form of a normal vector, i.e. a quadratic function  of multiple independent or correlated normal variables, is a generalized chi-square variable.

Operations on the density function 
The split normal distribution is most directly defined in terms of joining scaled sections of the density functions of different normal distributions and rescaling the density to integrate to one. The truncated normal distribution results from rescaling a section of a single density function.

Infinite divisibility and Cramér's theorem 
For any positive integer , any normal distribution with mean  and variance  is the distribution of the sum of  independent normal deviates, each with mean  and variance . This property is called infinite divisibility.

This result is known as Cramér's decomposition theorem, and is equivalent to saying that the convolution of two distributions is normal if and only if both are normal. Cramér's theorem implies that a linear combination of independent non-Gaussian variables will never have an exactly normal distribution, although it may approach it arbitrarily closely.

Bernstein's theorem 

Extensions 
The notion of normal distribution, being one of the most important distributions in probability theory, has been extended far beyond the standard framework of the univariate (that is one-dimensional) case (Case 1). All these extensions are also called normal or Gaussian laws, so a certain ambiguity in names exists.
 The multivariate normal distribution describes the Gaussian law in the k-dimensional Euclidean space. A vector  is multivariate-normally distributed if any linear combination of its components  has a (univariate) normal distribution. The variance of X is a k×k symmetric positive-definite matrix V. The multivariate normal distribution is a special case of the elliptical distributions. As such, its iso-density loci in the k = 2 case are ellipses and in the case of arbitrary k are ellipsoids.
 Rectified Gaussian distribution a rectified version of normal distribution with all the negative elements reset to 0
 Complex normal distribution deals with the complex normal vectors. A complex vector  is said to be normal if both its real and imaginary components jointly possess a 2k-dimensional multivariate normal distribution. The variance-covariance structure of X is described by two matrices: the variance matrix Γ, and the relation matrix C.
 Matrix normal distribution describes the case of normally distributed matrices.
 Gaussian processes are the normally distributed stochastic processes. These can be viewed as elements of some infinite-dimensional Hilbert space H, and thus are the analogues of multivariate normal vectors for the case . A random element  is said to be normal if for any constant  the scalar product  has a (univariate) normal distribution. The variance structure of such Gaussian random element can be described in terms of the linear covariance . Several Gaussian processes became popular enough to have their own names:
 Brownian motion,
 Brownian bridge,
 Ornstein–Uhlenbeck process.
 Gaussian q-distribution is an abstract mathematical construction that represents a "q-analogue" of the normal distribution.
 the q-Gaussian is an analogue of the Gaussian distribution, in the sense that it maximises the Tsallis entropy, and is one type of Tsallis distribution. Note that this distribution is different from the Gaussian q-distribution above.
 The Kaniadakis κ-Gaussian distribution is a generalization of the Gaussian distribution which arises from the Kaniadakis statistics, being one of the Kaniadakis distributions.

A random variable X has a two-piece normal distribution if it has a distribution

 
 

where μ is the mean and σ1 and σ2 are the standard deviations of the distribution to the left and right of the mean respectively.

The mean, variance and third central moment of this distribution have been determined

 

where E(X), V(X) and T(X) are the mean, variance, and third central moment respectively.

One of the main practical uses of the Gaussian law is to model the empirical distributions of many different random variables encountered in practice. In such case a possible extension would be a richer family of distributions, having more than two parameters and therefore being able to fit the empirical distribution more accurately. The examples of such extensions are:
 Pearson distribution — a four-parameter family of probability distributions that extend the normal law to include different skewness and kurtosis values.
 The generalized normal distribution, also known as the exponential power distribution, allows for distribution tails with thicker or thinner asymptotic behaviors.

Statistical inference

Estimation of parameters 

It is often the case that we do not know the parameters of the normal distribution, but instead want to estimate them. The standard approach to this problem is the maximum likelihood method, which requires maximization of the log-likelihood function:
 

Sample mean 

Estimator  is called the sample mean, since it is the arithmetic mean of all observations. In finite samples it is distributed normally:
 
The variance of this estimator is equal to the μμ-element of the inverse Fisher information matrix . This implies that the estimator is finite-sample efficient. This fact is widely used in determining sample sizes for opinion polls and the number of trials in Monte Carlo simulations.

The estimator is also asymptotically normal, which is a simple corollary of the fact that it is normal in finite samples:

Sample variance 

The estimator  is called the sample variance, since it is the variance of the sample. This other estimator is denoted  , and is also called the sample variance, which represents a certain ambiguity in terminology; its square root  is called the sample standard deviation.
 
Also, by the Lehmann–Scheffé theorem the estimator  is uniformly minimum variance unbiased (UMVU), which makes it the "best" estimator among all unbiased ones. In finite samples both  and  have scaled chi-squared distribution with  degrees of freedom:
 

The two estimators are also both asymptotically normal:
 

Confidence intervals 

By Cochran's theorem, for normal distributions the sample mean  and the sample variance s2 are independent, which means there can be no gain in considering their joint distribution. There is also a converse theorem: if in a sample the sample mean and sample variance are independent, then the sample must have come from the normal distribution.
 
This quantity t has the Student's t-distribution with  degrees of freedom, and it is an ancillary statistic (independent of the value of the parameters). Inverting the distribution of this t-statistics will allow us to construct the confidence interval for μ; similarly, inverting the χ2 distribution of the statistic s2 will give us the confidence interval for σ2:

These confidence intervals are of the confidence level , meaning that the true values μ and σ2 fall outside of these intervals with probability (or significance level) α. In practice people usually take , resulting in the 95% confidence intervals.

The approximate formulas become valid for large values of n, and are more convenient for the manual calculation since the standard normal quantiles zα/2 do not depend on n.

Normality tests 

Normality tests assess the likelihood that the given data set {x1, ..., xn} comes from a normal distribution. Typically the null hypothesis H0 is that the observations are distributed normally with unspecified mean μ and variance σ2, versus the alternative Ha that the distribution is arbitrary. Many tests (over 40) have been devised for this problem. The more prominent of them are outlined below:

Diagnostic plots are more intuitively appealing but subjective at the same time, as they rely on informal human judgement to accept or reject the null hypothesis.
 Q–Q plot, also known as normal probability plot or rankit plot—is a plot of the sorted values from the data set against the expected values of the corresponding quantiles from the standard normal distribution. That is, it's a plot of point of the form (Φ−1(pk), x(k)), where plotting points pk are equal to pk = (k − α)/(n + 1 − 2α) and α is an adjustment constant, which can be anything between 0 and 1. If the null hypothesis is true, the plotted points should approximately lie on a straight line.
 P–P plot – similar to the Q–Q plot, but used much less frequently. This method consists of plotting the points (Φ(z(k)), pk), where . For normally distributed data this plot should lie on a 45° line between (0, 0) and (1, 1). 
Goodness-of-fit tests:

Moment-based tests:
 D'Agostino's K-squared test
 Jarque–Bera test
 Shapiro–Wilk test: This is based on the fact that the line in the Q–Q plot has the slope of σ. The test compares the least squares estimate of that slope with the value of the sample variance, and rejects the null hypothesis if these two quantities differ significantly.
Tests based on the empirical distribution function:
 Anderson–Darling test
 Lilliefors test (an adaptation of the Kolmogorov–Smirnov test)

Bayesian analysis of the normal distribution 
Bayesian analysis of normally distributed data is complicated by the many different possibilities that may be considered:
 Either the mean, or the variance, or neither, may be considered a fixed quantity.
 When the variance is unknown, analysis may be done directly in terms of the variance, or in terms of the precision, the reciprocal of the variance. The reason for expressing the formulas in terms of precision is that the analysis of most cases is simplified.
 Both univariate and multivariate cases need to be considered.
 Either conjugate or improper prior distributions may be placed on the unknown variables.
 An additional set of cases occurs in Bayesian linear regression, where in the basic model the data is assumed to be normally distributed, and normal priors are placed on the regression coefficients. The resulting analysis is similar to the basic cases of independent identically distributed data.

The formulas for the non-linear-regression cases are summarized in the conjugate prior article.

Sum of two quadratics

Scalar form 
The following auxiliary formula is useful for simplifying the posterior update equations, which otherwise become fairly tedious.

This equation rewrites the sum of two quadratics in x by expanding the squares, grouping the terms in x, and completing the square. Note the following about the complex constant factors attached to some of the terms:
 The factor  has the form of a weighted average of y and z.
  This shows that this factor can be thought of as resulting from a situation where the reciprocals of quantities a and b add directly, so to combine a and b themselves, it's necessary to reciprocate, add, and reciprocate the result again to get back into the original units. This is exactly the sort of operation performed by the harmonic mean, so it is not surprising that  is one-half the harmonic mean of a and b.

Vector form 
A similar formula can be written for the sum of two vector quadratics: If x, y, z are vectors of length k, and A and B are symmetric, invertible matrices of size , then

where

Note that the form x′ A x is called a quadratic form and is a scalar:

In other words, it sums up all possible combinations of products of pairs of elements from x, with a separate coefficient for each. In addition, since , only the sum  matters for any off-diagonal elements of A, and there is no loss of generality in assuming that A is symmetric. Furthermore, if A is symmetric, then the form

Sum of differences from the mean 
Another useful formula is as follows:

where

With known variance 
For a set of i.i.d. normally distributed data points X of size n where each individual point x follows  with known variance σ2, the conjugate prior distribution is also normally distributed.

This can be shown more easily by rewriting the variance as the precision, i.e. using τ = 1/σ2. Then if  and  we proceed as follows.

First, the likelihood function is (using the formula above for the sum of differences from the mean):

Then, we proceed as follows:

In the above derivation, we used the formula above for the sum of two quadratics and eliminated all constant factors not involving μ. The result is the kernel of a normal distribution, with mean  and precision , i.e.

This can be written as a set of Bayesian update equations for the posterior parameters in terms of the prior parameters:

That is, to combine n data points with total precision of nτ (or equivalently, total variance of n/σ2) and mean of values , derive a new total precision simply by adding the total precision of the data to the prior total precision, and form a new mean through a precision-weighted average, i.e. a weighted average of the data mean and the prior mean, each weighted by the associated total precision. This makes logical sense if the precision is thought of as indicating the certainty of the observations: In the distribution of the posterior mean, each of the input components is weighted by its certainty, and the certainty of this distribution is the sum of the individual certainties. (For the intuition of this, compare the expression "the whole is (or is not) greater than the sum of its parts". In addition, consider that the knowledge of the posterior comes from a combination of the knowledge of the prior and likelihood, so it makes sense that we are more certain of it than of either of its components.)

The above formula reveals why it is more convenient to do Bayesian analysis of conjugate priors for the normal distribution in terms of the precision. The posterior precision is simply the sum of the prior and likelihood precisions, and the posterior mean is computed through a precision-weighted average, as described above. The same formulas can be written in terms of variance by reciprocating all the precisions, yielding the more ugly formulas

With known mean 
For a set of i.i.d. normally distributed data points X of size n where each individual point x follows  with known mean μ, the conjugate prior of the variance has an inverse gamma distribution or a scaled inverse chi-squared distribution. The two are equivalent except for having different parameterizations. Although the inverse gamma is more commonly used, we use the scaled inverse chi-squared for the sake of convenience. The prior for σ2 is as follows:

The likelihood function from above, written in terms of the variance, is:

where

Then:

The above is also a scaled inverse chi-squared distribution where

or equivalently

Reparameterizing in terms of an inverse gamma distribution, the result is:

With unknown mean and unknown variance 
For a set of i.i.d. normally distributed data points X of size n where each individual point x follows  with unknown mean μ and unknown variance σ2, a combined (multivariate) conjugate prior is placed over the mean and variance, consisting of a normal-inverse-gamma distribution.
Logically, this originates as follows:
 From the analysis of the case with unknown mean but known variance, we see that the update equations involve sufficient statistics computed from the data consisting of the mean of the data points and the total variance of the data points, computed in turn from the known variance divided by the number of data points.
 From the analysis of the case with unknown variance but known mean, we see that the update equations involve sufficient statistics over the data consisting of the number of data points and sum of squared deviations.
 Keep in mind that the posterior update values serve as the prior distribution when further data is handled. Thus, we should logically think of our priors in terms of the sufficient statistics just described, with the same semantics kept in mind as much as possible.
 To handle the case where both mean and variance are unknown, we could place independent priors over the mean and variance, with fixed estimates of the average mean, total variance, number of data points used to compute the variance prior, and sum of squared deviations. Note however that in reality, the total variance of the mean depends on the unknown variance, and the sum of squared deviations that goes into the variance prior (appears to) depend on the unknown mean. In practice, the latter dependence is relatively unimportant: Shifting the actual mean shifts the generated points by an equal amount, and on average the squared deviations will remain the same. This is not the case, however, with the total variance of the mean: As the unknown variance increases, the total variance of the mean will increase proportionately, and we would like to capture this dependence.
 This suggests that we create a conditional prior of the mean on the unknown variance, with a hyperparameter specifying the mean of the pseudo-observations associated with the prior, and another parameter specifying the number of pseudo-observations. This number serves as a scaling parameter on the variance, making it possible to control the overall variance of the mean relative to the actual variance parameter. The prior for the variance also has two hyperparameters, one specifying the sum of squared deviations of the pseudo-observations associated with the prior, and another specifying once again the number of pseudo-observations. Note that each of the priors has a hyperparameter specifying the number of pseudo-observations, and in each case this controls the relative variance of that prior. These are given as two separate hyperparameters so that the variance (aka the confidence) of the two priors can be controlled separately.
 This leads immediately to the normal-inverse-gamma distribution, which is the product of the two distributions just defined, with conjugate priors used (an inverse gamma distribution over the variance, and a normal distribution over the mean, conditional on the variance) and with the same four parameters just defined.

The priors are normally defined as follows:

The update equations can be derived, and look as follows:

The respective numbers of pseudo-observations add the number of actual observations to them. The new mean hyperparameter is once again a weighted average, this time weighted by the relative numbers of observations.

Occurrence and applications
The occurrence of normal distribution in practical problems can be loosely classified into four categories:
 Exactly normal distributions;
 Approximately normal laws, for example when such approximation is justified by the central limit theorem; and
 Distributions modeled as normal – the normal distribution being the distribution with maximum entropy for a given mean and variance.
 Regression problems – the normal distribution being found after systematic effects have been modeled sufficiently well.

Exact normality 

Certain quantities in physics are distributed normally, as was first demonstrated by James Clerk Maxwell. Examples of such quantities are:
 Probability density function of a ground state in a quantum harmonic oscillator.
 The position of a particle that experiences diffusion. If initially the particle is located at a specific point (that is its probability distribution is the Dirac delta function), then after time t its location is described by a normal distribution with variance t, which satisfies the diffusion equation . If the initial location is given by a certain density function , then the density at time t is the convolution of g and the normal PDF.

Approximate normality 
Approximately normal distributions occur in many situations, as explained by the central limit theorem. When the outcome is produced by many small effects acting additively and independently, its distribution will be close to normal. The normal approximation will not be valid if the effects act multiplicatively (instead of additively), or if there is a single external influence that has a considerably larger magnitude than the rest of the effects.
 In counting problems, where the central limit theorem includes a discrete-to-continuum approximation and where infinitely divisible and decomposable distributions are involved, such as
 Binomial random variables, associated with binary response variables;
 Poisson random variables, associated with rare events;
 Thermal radiation has a Bose–Einstein distribution on very short time scales, and a normal distribution on longer timescales due to the central limit theorem.

Assumed normality 

There are statistical methods to empirically test that assumption; see the above Normality tests section.
 In biology, the logarithm of various variables tend to have a normal distribution, that is, they tend to have a log-normal distribution (after separation on male/female subpopulations), with examples including:
 Measures of size of living tissue (length, height, skin area, weight);
 The length of inert appendages (hair, claws, nails, teeth) of biological specimens, in the direction of growth; presumably the thickness of tree bark also falls under this category;
 Certain physiological measurements, such as blood pressure of adult humans.
 In finance, in particular the Black–Scholes model, changes in the logarithm of exchange rates, price indices, and stock market indices are assumed normal (these variables behave like compound interest, not like simple interest, and so are multiplicative). Some mathematicians such as Benoit Mandelbrot have argued that log-Levy distributions, which possesses heavy tails would be a more appropriate model, in particular for the analysis for stock market crashes. The use of the assumption of normal distribution occurring in financial models has also been criticized by Nassim Nicholas Taleb in his works.
 Measurement errors in physical experiments are often modeled by a normal distribution. This use of a normal distribution does not imply that one is assuming the measurement errors are normally distributed, rather using the normal distribution produces the most conservative predictions possible given only knowledge about the mean and variance of the errors.
 In standardized testing, results can be made to have a normal distribution by either selecting the number and difficulty of questions (as in the IQ test) or transforming the raw test scores into "output" scores by fitting them to the normal distribution. For example, the SAT's traditional range of 200–800 is based on a normal distribution with a mean of 500 and a standard deviation of 100.

 Many scores are derived from the normal distribution, including percentile ranks ("percentiles" or "quantiles"), normal curve equivalents, stanines, z-scores, and T-scores. Additionally, some behavioral statistical procedures assume that scores are normally distributed; for example, t-tests and ANOVAs. Bell curve grading assigns relative grades based on a normal distribution of scores.
 In hydrology the distribution of long duration river discharge or rainfall, e.g. monthly and yearly totals, is often thought to be practically normal according to the central limit theorem. The blue picture, made with CumFreq, illustrates an example of fitting the normal distribution to ranked October rainfalls showing the 90% confidence belt based on the binomial distribution. The rainfall data are represented by plotting positions as part of the cumulative frequency analysis.

Methodological problems and peer review 
John Ioannidis argues that using normally distributed standard deviations as standards for validating research findings leave falsifiable predictions about phenomena that are not normally distributed untested. This includes, for example, phenomena that only appear when all necessary conditions are present and one cannot be a substitute for another in an addition-like way and phenomena that are not randomly distributed. Ioannidis argues that standard deviation-centered validation gives a false appearance of validity to hypotheses and theories where some but not all falsifiable predictions are normally distributed since the portion of falsifiable predictions that there is evidence against may and in some cases are in the non-normally distributed parts of the range of falsifiable predictions, as well as baselessly dismissing hypotheses for which none of the falsifiable predictions are normally distributed as if were they unfalsifiable when in fact they do make falsifiable predictions. It is argued by Ioannidis that many cases of mutually exclusive theories being accepted as "validated" by research journals are caused by failure of the journals to take in empirical falsifications of non-normally distributed predictions, and not because mutually exclusive theories are true, which they cannot be, although two mutually exclusive theories can both be wrong and a third one correct.

Computational methods

Generating values from normal distribution 

In computer simulations, especially in applications of the Monte-Carlo method, it is often desirable to generate values that are normally distributed. All these algorithms rely on the availability of a random number generator U capable of producing uniform random variates.
 The most straightforward method is based on the probability integral transform property: if U is distributed uniformly on (0,1), then Φ−1(U) will have the standard normal distribution. The drawback of this method is that it relies on calculation of the probit function Φ−1, which cannot be done analytically. Wichura gives a fast algorithm for computing this function to 16 decimal places, which is used by R to compute random variates of the normal distribution.
 An easy-to-program approximate approach that relies on the central limit theorem is as follows: generate 12 uniform U(0,1) deviates, add them all up, and subtract 6 – the resulting random variable will have approximately standard normal distribution. In truth, the distribution will be Irwin–Hall, which is a 12-section eleventh-order polynomial approximation to the normal distribution. This random deviate will have a limited range of (−6, 6). Note that in a true normal distribution, only 0.00034% of all samples will fall outside ±6σ.
 The Box–Muller method uses two independent random numbers U and V distributed uniformly on (0,1). Then the two random variables X and Y  will both have the standard normal distribution, and will be independent. This formulation arises because for a bivariate normal random vector (X, Y) the squared norm  will have the chi-squared distribution with two degrees of freedom, which is an easily generated exponential random variable corresponding to the quantity −2ln(U) in these equations; and the angle is distributed uniformly around the circle, chosen by the random variable V.
 The Marsaglia polar method is a modification of the Box–Muller method which does not require computation of the sine and cosine functions. In this method, U and V are drawn from the uniform (−1,1) distribution, and then  is computed. If S is greater or equal to 1, then the method starts over, otherwise the two quantities  are returned. Again, X and Y are independent, standard normal random variables.
 The Ratio method is a rejection method. The algorithm proceeds as follows:
 Generate two independent uniform deviates U and V;
 Compute X =  (V − 0.5)/U;
 Optional: if X2 ≤ 5 − 4e1/4U then accept X and terminate algorithm;
 Optional: if X2 ≥ 4e−1.35/U + 1.4 then reject X and start over from step 1;
 If X2 ≤ −4 lnU then accept X, otherwise start over the algorithm.
The two optional steps allow the evaluation of the logarithm in the last step to be avoided in most cases. These steps can be greatly improved so that the logarithm is rarely evaluated.
 The ziggurat algorithm is faster than the Box–Muller transform and still exact. In about 97% of all cases it uses only two random numbers, one random integer and one random uniform, one multiplication and an if-test. Only in 3% of the cases, where the combination of those two falls outside the "core of the ziggurat" (a kind of rejection sampling using logarithms), do exponentials and more uniform random numbers have to be employed.
 Integer arithmetic can be used to sample from the standard normal distribution. This method is exact in the sense that it satisfies the conditions of ideal approximation; i.e., it is equivalent to sampling a real number from the standard normal distribution and rounding this to the nearest representable floating point number.
 There is also some investigation into the connection between the fast Hadamard transform and the normal distribution, since the transform employs just addition and subtraction and by the central limit theorem random numbers from almost any distribution will be transformed into the normal distribution. In this regard a series of Hadamard transforms can be combined with random permutations to turn arbitrary data sets into a normally distributed data.

Numerical approximations for the normal CDF and normal quantile function 
The standard normal CDF is widely used in scientific and statistical computing.

The values Φ(x) may be approximated very accurately by a variety of methods, such as numerical integration, Taylor series, asymptotic series and continued fractions. Different approximations are used depending on the desired level of accuracy.

  give the approximation for Φ(x) for x > 0 with the absolute error  (algorithm 26.2.17):  where ϕ(x) is the standard normal PDF, and b0 = 0.2316419, b1 = 0.319381530, b2 = −0.356563782, b3 = 1.781477937, b4 = −1.821255978, b5 = 1.330274429.
  lists some dozens of approximations – by means of rational functions, with or without exponentials – for the  function. His algorithms vary in the degree of complexity and the resulting precision, with maximum absolute precision of 24 digits. An algorithm by  combines Hart's algorithm 5666 with a continued fraction approximation in the tail to provide a fast computation algorithm with a 16-digit precision.
  after recalling Hart68 solution is not suited for erf, gives a solution for both erf and erfc, with maximal relative error bound, via Rational Chebyshev Approximation.
  suggested a simple algorithm based on the Taylor series expansion  for calculating  with arbitrary precision. The drawback of this algorithm is comparatively slow calculation time (for example it takes over 300 iterations to calculate the function with 16 digits of precision when ).
 The GNU Scientific Library calculates values of the standard normal CDF using Hart's algorithms and approximations with Chebyshev polynomials.

Shore (1982) introduced simple approximations that may be incorporated in stochastic optimization models of engineering and operations research, like reliability engineering and inventory analysis. Denoting , the simplest approximation for the quantile function is:

Another approximation, somewhat less accurate, is the single-parameter approximation:

The latter had served to derive a simple approximation for the loss integral of the normal distribution, defined by

This approximation is particularly accurate for the right far-tail (maximum error of 10−3 for z≥1.4). Highly accurate approximations for the CDF, based on Response Modeling Methodology (RMM, Shore, 2011, 2012), are shown in Shore (2005).

Some more approximations can be found at: Error function#Approximation with elementary functions. In particular, small relative error on the whole domain for the CDF  and the quantile function  as well, is achieved via an explicitly invertible formula by Sergei Winitzki in 2008.

History

Development 
Although this theorem can be interpreted as the first obscure expression for the normal probability law, Stigler points out that de Moivre himself did not interpret his results as anything more than the approximate rule for the binomial coefficients, and in particular de Moivre lacked the concept of the probability density function.

In 1823 Gauss published his monograph "Theoria combinationis observationum erroribus minimis obnoxiae" where among other things he introduces several important statistical concepts, such as the method of least squares, the method of maximum likelihood, and the normal distribution. Gauss used M,  to denote the measurements of some unknown quantity V, and sought the "most probable" estimator of that quantity: the one that maximizes the probability  of obtaining the observed experimental results. In his notation φΔ is the probability density function of the measurement errors of magnitude Δ. Not knowing what the function φ is, Gauss requires that his method should reduce to the well-known answer: the arithmetic mean of the measured values. Starting from these principles, Gauss demonstrates that the only law that rationalizes the choice of arithmetic mean as an estimator of the location parameter, is the normal law of errors:
 
where h is "the measure of the precision of the observations". Using this normal law as a generic model for errors in the experiments, Gauss formulates what is now known as the non-linear weighted least squares method.

Although Gauss was the first to suggest the normal distribution law, Laplace made significant contributions. It was Laplace who first posed the problem of aggregating several observations in 1774, although his own solution led to the Laplacian distribution. It was Laplace who first calculated the value of the integral  in 1782, providing the normalization constant for the normal distribution. Finally, it was Laplace who in 1810 proved and presented to the Academy the fundamental central limit theorem, which emphasized the theoretical importance of the normal distribution.

It is of interest to note that in 1809 an Irish-American mathematician Robert Adrain published two insightful but flawed derivations of the normal probability law, simultaneously and independently from Gauss. His works remained largely unnoticed by the scientific community, until in 1871 they were exhumed by Abbe.

In the middle of the 19th century Maxwell demonstrated that the normal distribution is not just a convenient mathematical tool, but may also occur in natural phenomena: "The number of particles whose velocity, resolved in a certain direction, lies between x and x + dx is

Naming 
Today, the concept is usually known in English as the normal distribution or Gaussian distribution.  Other less common names include Gauss distribution, Laplace-Gauss distribution, the law of error, the law of facility of errors, Laplace's second law, Gaussian law.

Gauss himself apparently coined the term with reference to the "normal equations" involved in its applications, with normal having its technical meaning of orthogonal rather than "usual". However, by the end of the 19th century some authors had started using the name normal distribution, where the word "normal" was used as an adjective – the term now being seen as a reflection of the fact that this distribution was seen as typical, common – and thus "normal". Peirce (one of those authors) once defined "normal" thus: "...the 'normal' is not the average (or any other kind of mean) of what actually occurs, but of what would, in the long run, occur under certain circumstances." Around the turn of the 20th century Pearson popularized the term normal as a designation for this distribution.

Also, it was Pearson who first wrote the distribution in terms of the standard deviation σ as in modern notation. Soon after this, in year 1915, Fisher added the location parameter to the formula for normal distribution, expressing it in the way it is written nowadays:

The term "standard normal", which denotes the normal distribution with zero mean and unit variance came into general use around the 1950s, appearing in the popular textbooks by P. G. Hoel (1947) "Introduction to mathematical statistics" and A. M. Mood (1950) "Introduction to the theory of statistics".

See also 

 Bates distribution – similar to the Irwin–Hall distribution, but rescaled back into the 0 to 1 range
 Behrens–Fisher problem – the long-standing problem of testing whether two normal samples with different variances have same means;
 Bhattacharyya distance – method used to separate mixtures of normal distributions
 Erdős–Kac theorem – on the occurrence of the normal distribution in number theory
 Full width at half maximum
 Gaussian blur – convolution, which uses the normal distribution as a kernel
 Normally distributed and uncorrelated does not imply independent
 Ratio normal distribution
 Reciprocal normal distribution
 Standard normal table
 Stein's lemma
 Sub-Gaussian distribution
 Sum of normally distributed random variables
 Tweedie distribution – The normal distribution is a member of the family of Tweedie exponential dispersion models.
 Wrapped normal distribution – the Normal distribution applied to a circular domain
 Z-test – using the normal distribution

Notes

References

Citations

Sources 

 
  In particular, the entries for "bell-shaped and bell curve", "normal (distribution)", "Gaussian", and "Error, law of error, theory of errors, etc.".
 
 
 
 
 
 
 
 
 
 
 
 
 
 
 
 
 
 
 
 
 
 
 
  Translated by Stephen M. Stigler in Statistical Science 1 (3), 1986: .

External links 

 
 Normal distribution calculator

 
Continuous distributions
Conjugate prior distributions
Exponential family distributions
Stable distributions
Location-scale family probability distributions